The Norman Lear Center is a multi-disciplinary research and public policy center exploring implications of the convergence of entertainment, commerce, and society.  It is based at the USC Annenberg School for Communication. Through scholarship and research, and its programs of visiting fellows, conferences, public events and publications, the Lear Center works to be at the forefront of discussion and practice in the field.

History 
The Center is named for benefactor Norman Lear, the social activist and philanthropist, and television producer, and was founded and is directed by Marty Kaplan, associate dean of the USC Annenberg School, who has been a political speechwriter, Hollywood studio executive, and screenwriter-producer.

The Lear Center officially launched on January 24, 2000. Some of the programs it houses include Entertainment Goes Global, which explores the political, cultural, economic and technological implications of the globalization of entertainment; Celebrity, Politics & Public Life, wherein faculty and deans from over 20 USC departments convene to develop an inter-disciplinary analysis of American political life, as it is shaped by popular culture; and Hollywood, Health & Society, which provides entertainment industry professionals with accurate and timely information for health storylines. Hollywood, Health & Society is funded by, and works closely with such governmental agencies as the Centers for Disease Control and Prevention, the National Institutes of Health, and the National Cancer Institute. That program hosts its annual Sentinel for Health Awards to recognize exemplary television storylines that best inform, educate and motivate viewers to make choices for healthier and safer lives.

Since 2005, the Lear Center’s Grand Avenue Intervention Project has been a driving force behind the civic outreach for the planning of a new  park in the heart of downtown Los Angeles. In partnership with the Los Angeles Times, the Lear Center solicited design proposals from the public and published a selection of them in a special section of the Times.

The Lear Center's publishing imprint has published several works of scholarship such as Artists, Technology & The Ownership of Creative Content, Warners' War: Politics, Pop Culture & Propaganda in Wartime Hollywood, Frank Capra and the Image of the Journalist in American Film, and Ready to Share: Creativity & Fashion in Digital Culture.

References

External links
 
 USC Trojan Family Alumni Magazine Article on the Center
 LAT Article about the Grand Avenue Intervention

Public policy schools
Centers of the University of Southern California
Center